Moberly is an unincorporated community located in Madison County, Kentucky, United States. Its post office is closed. It is located at the intersection of Kentucky Route 52 and Kentucky Route 374.

References

Unincorporated communities in Madison County, Kentucky
Unincorporated communities in Kentucky